William Twaddell could refer to:

 William J. Twaddell (1884–1922), assassinated Irish politician
 William Freeman Twaddell (1906–1982), American linguist
 William H. Twaddell, American diplomat
 William Twaddell, the inventor of the Twaddell scale